{|

{{Infobox ship characteristics
|Hide header=
|Header caption=
|Ship class=
|Ship type=Submarine chaser
|Ship tonnage=
|Ship displacement=* standard
 trial
|Ship length=* overall
 waterline
|Ship beam= 
|Ship height= 
|Ship draught= 
|Ship draft= 
|Ship propulsion= 2 × Kampon Mk.22 Model 6 diesels, 2 shafts, 2,600 bhp
|Ship power= 
|Ship speed= 
|Ship range=  at 
|Ship boats=
|Ship troops=
|Ship complement= 59
|Ship capacity=
|Ship crew=
|Ship EW=
|Ship armament=*2 × 40 mm heavy machine guns
36 × depth charges
2 × Type 94 depth charge projectors
1 × depth charge thrower
1 × Type 93 active sonar
1 × Type 93 hydrophone
No.4, November 19442 × 40 mm heavy machine guns
3 × Type 96 25 mm AA guns
36 × depth charges
2 × Type 94 depth charge projectors
2 × depth charge throwers (estimate)
1 × 13-Gō surface search radar
1 × Type 3 active sonar
1 × Type 93 hydrophone
|Ship armour=
}}

History
CH-7 was laid down on 30 October 1937 at the Yokohama shipyard of Tsurumi Iron Works, launched on 10 June 1938, and completed and commissioned on 15 November 1938. On 8 December 1941, she was assigned to Sub Chaser Division 11 (SCD 11) under Commandeer Hayashi Risaku, 9th Base Force, Southern Expeditionary Fleet. CH-8 and CH-9 were also assigned to the squadron.

Invasion of Borneo
In November 1941, she was assigned to the Borneo Invasion Group (under Rear Admiral Kurita Takeo), code-named "Operation B" (the invasion of British Borneo). The force consisted of five Imperial Japanese Army transports carrying the 25th Army (Katori Maru, Hiyoshi Maru, Myoho Maru, Kenkon Maru, and Nichiran Maru); and five Imperial Japanese Navy transports (Hokkai Maru carrying the No.2 Yokosuka Special Naval Landing Force, Tonan Maru No 3 carrying the 4th Naval Construction Unit, and three transports carrying equipment and supplies, Unyo Maru No. 2, Kamikawa Maru, and Mitakesan Maru). The force was escorted by CH-7 along with and two minesweepers (W-3 and W-6) while two heavy cruisers, two light cruisers ( and ), six destroyers, provided distant cover; and a seaplane tender provided air support. On 13 December 1941, the convoy left Cam Ranh Bay, Indochina (Mitakesan Maru is later detached to deliver supplies to the Philippines). On 15 December 1941, the transports arrived and disembarked their troops unopposed at Seria, Miri, and Lutong, successfully occupying the airfields and oil wells. On 17 December 1941, the destroyer Shinonome was sunk by a Dutch Dornier Do 24 flying-boat flying from Tarakan. CH-7 remained at Miri with one battalion of the 25th Army while the rest of the force departed on 22 December 1941 to occupy Kuching. On 25 December 1941, CH-7 left Miri arriving at Kuching on 26 December 1941.

Invasion of Palembang and Banka Island
On 9 February 1942, she departed Camranh Bay as part of "Operation L" tasked with the invasion and occupation of Palembang and Banka Island, Sumatra. The invasion force consisted of eight transports escorted by subchasers, CH-7 and CH-8; light cruiser Sendai; destroyers Fubuki, Hatsuyuki, Shirayuki, and Asagiri; and minesweepers W-1, W-2, W-3, W-4 and W-5.

Invasion of Northern Sumatra
On 10 March 1942, she departed Singapore as part of "Operation T" tasked with the invasion and occupation of Northern Sumatra. The invasion force consisted of 4 convoys carrying 22,000 soldiers including the Imperial Guards Division. CH-7 served as escort along with section 1 of Minesweeper Division 44 for one of the convoys consisting of the minelayer Hatsutaka, submarine tender Nagoya Maru, and eight transports. The force reached Sumatra unmolested on 12 March 1942 as Allied air and naval power had been severely reduced after the Battle of the Java Sea and the Dutch East Indies campaign.

Reinforcement of Burma
On 19 March 1942, she departed Camranh Bay as part of "Operation U" tasked with the reinforcement of Japanese troops in Burma. The convoy is escorted by subchasers CH-7 and CH-8 along with a light cruiser Kashii (which serves as flagship), five destroyers (Shikinami, Asakaze, Harukaze, Hatakaze, and Matsukaze); an escort ship (Shimushu); a minelayer (Hatsutaka), 3 minesweepers (W-1, W-3, W-4); the 91st Subchaser Division  (AN Choko Maru, PC Shonan Maru No. 5, PC Shonan Maru No. 7); a gunboat (Eiko Maru); an Ōtori-class torpedo boat (Kari), and an auxiliary gunboat (Kosho Maru).  The warships escorted the First Burma Transport Convoy consisting of 32 transports carrying the main body of the Imperial Japanese Army's 56th Division.

Interim
On 14 July 1942, CH-7 is assigned along with CH-8 and CH-9 to Submarine Chaser Division 11, 10th Special Base Force, 1st Southern Expeditionary Fleet, Southwest Area Fleet. She conducts various escort duties throughout southeast Asia primarily in the waters surrounding Vietnam, Indonesia, Singapore, and Malaysia.

Convoy Mashi-03
On 7 November 1944, she departed Manila for Singapore with CH-8 as escort for convoy MASHI-03 consisting of tankers Nichinan Maru No. 2 and Shimotsu Maru. On 8 November 1944, Nichinan Maru No. 2 was torpedoed and sunk by the USS Redfin (killing 86).  On 9 November 1944, Shimotsu Maru was torpedoed and sunk by the USS Barbero (killing 39). The convoy was dissolved.

Fate
On 11 April 1945 while conducting escort duty for auxiliary transport Agata Maru in the Andaman Sea 11 miles north east of the Nicobar Islands, she was attacked by Consolidated B-24 Liberator bombers of the Royal Air Force's No. 203 Squadron. CH-7  was removed from the Navy list on 25 May 1945.

Notes

References

Further reading

1938 ships
No.4-class submarine chasers
Ships sunk by British aircraft